Peter Sippel (born 6 October 1969) is a former German football referee who is based in Munich. He refereed for FC Würzburger Kickers of the Bavarian Football Association.

Refereeing career
From 2004 until 2011, Peter Sippel has refereed quite a few European matches, mainly UEFA Cup matches and qualifiers.

Sippel retired from officiating in 2016 because of personal reasons. His final Bundesliga match officiated was between Darmstadt 98 and Borussia Mönchengladbach.

Personal life
Sippel has a professional diploma in business administration, and lives in Munich.

References

External links
 Profile at DFB.de
 Profile at worldfootball.net

1969 births
Living people
German football referees
UEFA Europa League referees